Carex meeboldiana is a tussock-forming perennial in the family Cyperaceae. It is native to south eastern parts of Asia.

See also
 List of Carex species

References

meeboldiana
Plants described in 1920
Taxa named by Georg Kükenthal
Flora of Thailand
Flora of Myanmar